Smooth Sailing or Smooth Sailin' may refer to:

Albums
 Smooth Sailing (Arnett Cobb album) or the title song (see below), 1960
 Smooth Sailing (Rob Schneiderman album) or the title track, 1990
 Smooth Sailing (Teddy Edwards album), 2003
 Smooth Sailing, by Maysa Leak, 2004
 Smooth Sailin (The Isley Brothers album), 1987
 Smooth Sailin (T. G. Sheppard album), 1980

Songs
 "Smooth Sailing" (song), by Queens of the Stone Age, 2013
 "Smooth Sailing", a 1951 song composed by Arnett Cobb, recorded by Ella Fitzgerald from Lullabies of Birdland, 1956
 "Smooth Sailin (Leon Bridges song), 2015
 "Smooth Sailin (Sonny Throckmorton song), 1980
 "Smooth Sailin, by Jim Weatherly, 1979
 "Smooth Sailin, by Roscoe from Young Roscoe Philaphornia, 2003

Other uses
 Smooth Sailing, a 1947 short film by Jerry Hopper
 Smooth Sailin', a chocolate bar brand